The following is a list of female NASCAR drivers who have participated in a national or regional touring series race since the organization's inception in 1949, along with statistical totals for their NASCAR careers. While some female NASCAR drivers have transitioned or attempted to transition from open-wheel racing and sports car racing (such as Sarah Fisher, Janet Guthrie, and Danica Patrick), most have climbed the stock-car racing ladder (such as Tammy Jo Kirk, Johanna Long, and Shawna Robinson), beginning to race full-sized stock cars in their teenage years. A handful of women (such as Mackena Bell and Kenzie Ruston) have raced with the help of NASCAR's Drive for Diversity program since its creation in 2004.

At least 125 women have qualified for and started a race in one of NASCAR's touring series, including 16 in the NASCAR Cup Series. As of April 2021, Shawna Robinson, Hailie Deegan, Manami Kobayashi, and Gracie Trotter remain the only women to have won a race in one of NASCAR's touring series. Robinson won three times between 1988 and 1989 in the now-defunct Dash Series, Deegan won three races in the K&N Pro Series West between 2018 and 2019. In 2019, Kobayashi won in her one and only start in the NASCAR Whelen Euro Series (in the Elite Club Division). Trotter won a race in the renamed ARCA Menards Series West in 2020, becoming the second female winner in the West Series, as well as the first winner in the series under the ARCA banner. She also became the first winner in any ARCA-sanctioned series, because there have been no female winners in the main ARCA Menards Series as of April 2021.

Six female drivers: Deegan, Kirk, Patrick, Robinson, Mara Reyes, and Brittney Zamora have won poles. Relatively few women have contested a full season in any of NASCAR's touring series, although this is increasingly common. As for the 2022  season there are only 2 females running a full season  Hailie Deegan and Toni Breidinger.

History

20th century

NASCAR has seen varying levels of participation by female drivers throughout its ranks since the sanctioning body's inception in 1949. Sara Christian competed in the inaugural NASCAR race at Charlotte Speedway (she had Bob Flock finish the race). In the second official race, at Daytona Beach and Road Course, Christian was joined by Ethel Mobley and Louise Smith, with Mobley finishing first out of the 3, in 11th. Through the 1950s and 1960s, female racers made only a handful of starts in NASCAR's touring series. Betty Skelton Erde wasn't technically a NASCAR driver, but she drove the pace car at Daytona in 1954, and was clocked at a speed of 105.88 mph (170.40 km/h) on the sand, setting a stock car speed record for women.

No woman had raced NASCAR in a decade when Janet Guthrie started the 1976 World 600, finishing 15th, ahead of Dale Earnhardt. In 1977, Janet Guthrie would become the first woman to lead a Winston Cup Series race under caution, at Ontario Speedway. In 1986, Patty Moise would become the first woman to lead in a Busch Series race.

In 1988, Charlotte/Daytona Dash Series (later the Goody's Dash Series) driver Shawna Robinson became the first woman to win a NASCAR Touring Series event, also earning "Rookie of the Year" and "Most Popular Driver" honors. In her sophomore Dash Series run, Robinson became the first woman to earn the pole position for a NASCAR touring series race. Robinson would later become the first female driver to clinch the pole in any of the three major series, winning qualifying for the March 12, 1994 Xfinity Series Busch Light 300 at Atlanta Motor Speedway.

In Australia, Terri Sawyer won the Moomba 100 NASCAR race at the Calder Park Thunderdome, Melbourne on March 3, 1991 driving a Pontiac.  Terri had previously attempted the NASCAR Sportsman series in the US

Women began to compete more frequently throughout NASCAR's lower series over the course of the 1990s. Patty Moise made a record 133 Xfinity Series starts between 1986 and 1998 and Tammy Jo Kirk scored 37 top-10 finishes and two poles in what was then known as the All Pro Series, before making the first starts for a woman in the Camping World Truck Series.

2000s

After a hiatus to start a family, Shawna Robinson returned to stock car racing in 1999, contesting a full ARCA Bondo/Mar-Hyde Series season in 2000 before returning to sporadic NASCAR-sanctioned competition over the following several seasons. In 2001, Robinson would be the first woman to finish a race in the Winston Cup Series since Janet Guthrie in 1980. In 2003, Robinson would also have the first all-female pit crew for a Craftsman Truck Series race at Texas Motor Speedway.

In 2004, NASCAR started the Drive for Diversity program, hoping to develop a more diverse driver base. While the program has succeeded in launching the careers of minority drivers including NASCAR Cup Series race winner Kyle Larson, Camping World Truck Series race winner Bubba Wallace, and 2016 NASCAR Xfinity Series champion Daniel Suárez, the program's early years were less effective in expanding the roster of female drivers in NASCAR's top touring series.

2010s

In 2010, IndyCar Series driver Danica Patrick joined NASCAR, racing part-time in the K&N Pro Series East and the Nationwide Series. Patrick would record a major milestone by clinching the pole position in the 2012 DRIVE4COPD 300, being the first female driver to clinch it since Shawna Robinson. However, Patrick would finish 38th after a crash. In 2012, Patrick would eventually race part-time in the Sprint Cup Series.

In 2011, Snowball Derby winner Johanna Long entered the Camping World Truck Series at 19 years of age, being the youngest female driver to race in the series. Long would eventually race in the Nationwide Series, making her debut in the 2012 DRIVE4COPD 300.

In 2012, Danica Patrick was voted NASCAR's Most Popular Nationwide Driver, becoming the first woman to receive that award in NASCAR's top three divisions.

In 2013, Patrick became the first woman in Sprint Cup history to have a full-time ride in the series (with Stewart-Haas Racing), and eventually the first female driver to clinch the pole position and lead a green flag lap, both occurring at the 2013 Daytona 500, becoming the first woman to lead both the Indianapolis 500 and the Daytona 500. Patrick later finished the race in eighth place, the highest finish for a woman in the Daytona 500. She also became the first woman to race at every racetrack on the circuit. In 2014, Patrick became the first woman to race in the 2014 Sprint Unlimited. At Talladega she became the first woman to lead laps there. That year she had three top 10 finishes with her best finish of sixth at Atlanta. In 2015, Patrick tied Janet Guthrie for most top ten finishes for a woman with a seventh place finish at Martinsville. A few weeks later she passed Guthrie for the most top ten finishes for a woman in Sprint Cup history at Bristol. At Michigan she became the first woman to lead under green on a non-restrictor plate track. At Kentucky, Patrick became the first woman to make 100 starts in NASCAR's Cup Series. In 2016, Patrick led a career high 30 laps and completed more circuits than all but three other drivers. Patrick opened 2017 season with a fourth place finish in the Advance Auto Parts Clash (an exhibition race for previous pole winners). She retired from full-time stock car racing after the 2018 Daytona 500.

The NASCAR Whelen Euro Series formed the Lady Cup, a championship system for female drivers in 2014. In 2016, a record 18 different women started a race in one of NASCAR's touring series. Julia Landauer was the most successful within her respective series, finishing fourth in points in the K&N Pro Series West with seven top-five finishes in fourteen races.

In 2018, Hailie Deegan became the first female driver to win a NASCAR touring series race in roughly three decades, winning in the K&N Pro Series West in the series' race at Meridian Speedway. She followed this up by winning two more races in 2019, which came at the Las Vegas Motor Speedway Dirt Track and at Colorado National Speedway.

In 2019, Manami Kobayashi became the third woman to win a race in a NASCAR touring series race. She won in her debut in Whelen Euro Series Elite Club Division by lapping just 0.001 seconds from the reference time. Another woman (Alina Loibnegger) finished second, in the first time ever two women finished 1–2 in NASCAR history.

2020s

In 2020, Gracie Trotter became the second female driver to win in the West Series, with her victory in the race at the Las Vegas Motor Speedway Bullring on September 26. That year, the series became sanctioned by ARCA and renamed the ARCA Menards Series West, so Trotter became the first female to win in the series under the ARCA name.

2021 saw a number of milestones for female drivers. Toni Breidinger, the first Arab American female driver in NASCAR, returned to the ARCA Menards Series for the first time since 2018, joining Young's Motorsports to compete part-time for them as part of the Truck Series team's first foray into ARCA. Young's also announced that she would make her debut in the Truck Series with them in their new part-time No. 82 truck. Trotter moved up from the West Series to the main ARCA Menards Series, where she would remain in Toyota's driver development program and drive part-time for Venturini Motorsports in the team's No. 15 and No. 25 cars. Deegan moved up from the ARCA Menards Series to the Truck Series full-time, continuing to drive for David Gilliland Racing. Natalie Decker moved up from the Truck Series to the Xfinity Series, where she would run five races in the No. 23 car, jointly fielded by RSS Racing, Reaume Brothers Racing, and later Our Motorsports. Cobb planned on making her Cup Series debut in the spring Talladega race, driving the No. 15 for Rick Ware Racing and becoming the first female driver to race in the series since Patrick's retirement. However, due to the race not having practice and qualifying, NASCAR would not approve Cobb to compete in it with her lack of prior Cup Series experience.

Summary

Drivers

NASCAR Cup Series
Formerly Strictly Stock Series (1949), Grand National Series (1950–70), Winston Cup Series (1971–2003), Nextel Cup Series (2004–07), Sprint Cup Series (2008–16), and Monster Energy NASCAR Cup Series (2017–19)

Xfinity Series
Formerly Budweiser Late Model Sportsman Series (1982–83), Busch Grand National Series (1984–94), Busch Grand National Division (1995–2003), Busch Series (2004–07), Nationwide Series (2008–14) and Xfinity Series (2015–)

Truck Series
Formerly SuperTruck Series by Craftsman (1995), Craftsman Truck Series (1996–2008), Camping World Truck Series (2009–2018), and Gander Outdoors Truck Series (2019)

ARCA Menards Series
Several women have qualified for and started at least one ARCA Menards Series race, like Danica Patrick, Leilani Munter, Alli Owens, Erin Crocker, Shawna Robinson, Sarah Cornett-Ching, Deborah Renshaw, Maryeve Dufault, Toni Breidinger, Milka Duno, Jennifer Jo Cobb, Nicole Behar, Hailie Deegan, Natalie Decker, and others. Although the series has existed since 1953, the series was not officially affiliated with NASCAR until its buyout on April 27, 2018. 2020 was the first season of ARCA as a NASCAR-sanctioned series, so this list begins with 2020. Also in 2020, the former K&N Pro Series East and K&N Pro Series West became the ARCA Menards Series East and ARCA Menards Series West, respectively.

ARCA Menards Series (2020–present only)

ARCA Menards Series East

Formerly Busch North Series (1987–2005), Busch East Series (2006–07), Camping World East Series (2008–09) and K&N Pro Series East (2010–19)

ARCA Menards Series West

Formerly Pacific Coast Late Model Division (1954–69), Grand National West (1970), Winston West Series (1971–93), Winston Transcontinental Series (1994), Winston West Series (1995–2003), West Series (2004–05), AutoZone West Series (2006), West Series (2007), Camping World West Series (2008–09) and K&N Pro Series West (2010–19)

Whelen Modified Tour
Formerly Winston Modified Tour (1985–93) and Featherlite Modified Series (1994–2004)

International series

PEAK Mexico Series

Formerly Desafío Corona (2004–06), Corona Series (2007–11), Toyota Series (2012–14), Mexico Series (2015)

Note: Only partial statistics available prior to 2008 season

FedEx Challenge Series

Formerly Mexico T4 Series (2004–07), Mini Stock Series (2009–10), Stock V6 Series (2011–15)

Note: Only partial statistics available

Pinty's Series

Formerly Canadian Tire Series (2007–15)

Whelen Euro Series Elite 1 Division

The series exists since 2009, but was not officially affiliated with NASCAR until 2012. 2012 was the first season as a NASCAR-sanctioned series, so the list will be made from 2012 onwards.

Formerly Euro-Racecar NASCAR Touring Series Elite Division (2012) and Whelen Euro Series Elite Division (2013)

Whelen Euro Series Elite 2 Division

Formerly Euro-Racecar NASCAR Touring Series Open Division (2012) and Whelen Euro Series Open Division (2013)

Note: Full statistics only available beginning with 2014 season

Whelen Euro Series Elite Club Division

Note: Only partial statistics available

Defunct series

AutoZone Elite Division, Midwest Series (2004–06)

Formerly RE/MAX Challenge Series (1998–2002) and International Truck and Engine Corporation Midwest Series (2003) 

AutoZone Elite Division, Northwest Series (2004–06)

Formerly Northwest Tour (1985–86), Winston Northwest Tour (1987–94), REB-CO Northwest Tour (1995–97), and Raybestos Northwest Series (1998–2003)

AutoZone Elite Division, Southeast Series (2004–06)

Formerly Winston All Pro Series (1991–93), Slim Jim All-Pro Series (1994–2000), Gatorade All Pro Series (2001), Hills Bros. All Pro Series (2002), and Kodak Southeast Series (2003)

AutoZone Elite Division, Southwest Series (2003–06)

Formerly Featherlite Southwest Tour (1986–2002)

Goody's Dash Series (1992–2003)

Formerly Baby Grand Division (1975–79), International Sedan Series (1980–82), Darlington Dash Series (1983–84), Daytona Dash Series (1985), Charlotte/Daytona Dash Series (1986–89) and Dash Series (1990–91)

Note: Only partial statistics available for the late 1970s

Whelen Southern Modified Tour (2005–2016)

Notes
 Pagan's one NASCAR start came at a combination race between NASCAR's premier national touring series (now Cup Series) and its west coast series (now ARCA Menards Series West). It is listed in both sections.
 Hiss failed in her attempt to qualify for the Winston Cup Series and Winston West Series companion race at Ontario Motor Speedway in 1976. 81 drivers entered and only 40 made the race. She is listed in both sections.
 Participations (starts, wins, Top 5s, Top 10s and pole-positions) in K&N East and K&N West companion races at Iowa Speedway and Gateway Motorsports Park in 2018 and 2019 are counted for both series per the source, to which the NASCAR website itself links (That includes Deegan's in 2018 and 2019 and Zamora's in 2019). Note: other drivers to have competed in the companion race in previous years are not so double-counted, per the same source. Starting in 2020, companion races between ARCA Menards Series and ARCA Menards Series East are also double-conted (That includes Deegan's in 2020; Moyer's & Trotter's in 2021), the same applies to companion races between ARCA Menards Series and ARCA Menards Series West (That includes Breidinger's, Burgess' & Trotter's in 2021).
 A number of women qualified for and started at least one ARCA Menards Series race prior to NASCAR's buyout of the series including Leilani Munter, Alli Owens, Erin Crocker, Shawna Robinson, Sarah Cornett-Ching, Deborah Renshaw, Maryeve Dufault, Toni Breidinger, Milka Duno, Jennifer Jo Cobb, Nicole Behar, Hailie Deegan, Natalie Decker and others. The series was founded in 1953, was purchased by NASCAR on April 27, 2018, and was officially NASCAR-sanctioned beginning in 2020.
 Decker had 29 ARCA Menards Series starts between 2017 and 2019, with 2 Top 5s, 12 Top 10s and 1 pole-position, Deegan had 6 ARCA Menards Series starts in 2019, with 1 Top 5 and 4 Top 10s and Breidinger had 3 ARCA Menards Series starts in 2018, with 1 Top 10 but since 2020 ARCA Menards season was the first season as a NASCAR-sanctioned series these stats aren't included.
 The series exists since 2009, but was not officially affiliated with NASCAR until 2012. 2012 was the first season as a NASCAR-sanctioned series, so the list will be made from 2012 onwards.
 Geiger competed at Hockenheimring in 2019 Whelen Euro Series Elite Club Division sharing the No. 70 Chevrolet Camaro with her father (Karl Geiger), but since he started in the car, he is scored in the race results.

See also

 List of female racing drivers
 List of female Formula One drivers
 List of female Indianapolis 500 drivers
 List of female 24 Hours of Le Mans drivers

References

External links

 Racer Chicks website
 Jayski's Silly Season Site page
 Racing Reference racing statistics

NASCAR
Female